M7, M-7, or M.7 may refer to:

Transportation

Air
 M7 Aerospace, a United States aerospace company
 Macchi M.7, an Italian flying boat fighter in service from 1923 to 1930
 Miles M.7 Nighthawk, a 1930s British training and communications monoplane
 Maule M-7, an American single-engine light aircraft
 Marsland Aviation (IATA code), a Sudanese airline
 Tropical Airways (IATA code), a defunct small airline based in Haiti

Rail
 Bucharest Metro Line M7, a planned line of the Bucharest Metro
 M7 (Istanbul Metro), a metro line under construction in Istanbul, Turkey
 LSWR M7 class, a steam locomotive
 M7 (railcar), a Long Island Rail Road and Metro-North Railroad railcar
 NMBS/SNCB M7 railcar, a National Railway Company of Belgium (NMBS/SNCB) railcar

Road

 M7 (New York City bus), a New York City Bus route in Manhattan
 Westlink M7, an urban motorway in the Sydney, Australia area
 Metroad 7 (Brisbane) (M7), an urban motorway in Brisbane, Australia
 M-7 (Michigan highway), the former designation of M-86, a state highway in Michigan
 M7 (East London), a Metropolitan Route in East London, South Africa
 M7 (Cape Town), a Metropolitan Route in Cape Town, South Africa
 M7 (Johannesburg), a Metropolitan Route in Johannesburg, South Africa
 M7 (Pretoria), a Metropolitan Route in Pretoria, South Africa
 M7 (Durban), a Metropolitan Route in Durban, South Africa
 M7 (Port Elizabeth), a Metropolitan Route in Port Elizabeth, South Africa
 M7 motorway (Ireland), a motorway in Ireland
 M7 motorway (Hungary), a motorway in Hungary
 M7 highway (Russia), the Volga Highway in Russia
 Highway M07 (Ukraine)
 M7 Road (Zambia), a road in Zambia

Military
 M7 grenade launcher, an American World War II era rifle grenade launcher
 M7 Priest, an American self-propelled artillery vehicle
 M7 bayonet, a United States military bayonet
 M7 mine, a United States anti-tank mine
 M7 Snow Tractor
 M-7, a Chinese tactical ballistic missile; See S-75 Dvina
 Medium Tank M7, a tank design project conceived as an up-gunned replacement for the M3/M5 Stuart
 XM7 rifle, a U.S. Army assault rifle

Technology
 Apple M7, a dedicated motion co-processor accompanying the Apple A7 SoC
 HTC One (2013) or HTC M7, HTC's 2013 high-end flagship smartphone
 Intel m7, a brand of microprocessors
 Leica M7, a Leica rangefinder camera
 SPARC M7, an upcoming computer chip by Oracle
 M7, one of the 1N400x general-purpose diodes

Other uses
 "M7", a shorthand reference to Yoweri Museveni, President of Uganda
 Messier 7, an open star cluster in the constellation Scorpius
 Major seventh
 Major seventh chord
 M7 (perfume), a men's fragrance produced by Yves Saint Laurent
 M7 Group S.A., a Luxembourg-based satellite TV provider for several European countries
 M7, a difficulty grade in mixed climbing

See also
 M1907 (disambiguation)